The Million Pound Deposit is a 1930 thriller novel by the British writer E. Phillips Oppenheim. It was published in the United States by Little, Brown.

Synopsis
The formula for a revolutionary new synthetic silk is stolen from the company producing it and a ransom demand of a million pounds is sent.

References

Bibliography
 Howarth, Patrick. Play Up and Play the Game: The Heroes of Popular Fiction. Eyre Methuen, 1973.
 Reilly, John M. Twentieth Century Crime & Mystery Writers. Springer, 2015.
 Server, Lee. Encyclopedia of Pulp Fiction Writers. Infobase Publishing, 2014.

1930 British novels
Novels by E. Phillips Oppenheim
British thriller novels
British crime novels
British mystery novels
Hodder & Stoughton books
Novels set in London
Little, Brown and Company books